Doral William Pilling (14 January 1906 – 24 December 1982) was a Canadian athlete who competed in the 1928 Summer Olympics.

He was born in Cardston.

In 1927 he became NCAA champion representing the University of Utah.

In 1928, he finished twelfth in the Olympic javelin throw event.

At the 1930 Empire Games, he won the silver medal in the javelin throw competition.

He died in Calgary.

References

External links
sports-reference.com

1906 births
Canadian male javelin throwers
Olympic track and field athletes of Canada
Athletes (track and field) at the 1928 Summer Olympics
Athletes (track and field) at the 1930 British Empire Games
Sportspeople from Alberta
People from Cardston
1982 deaths
Utah Utes men's track and field athletes
Commonwealth Games silver medallists for Canada
Commonwealth Games medallists in athletics
20th-century Canadian people
Medallists at the 1930 British Empire Games